Gove County (county code GO) is a county in the U.S. state of Kansas. As of the 2020 census, the county population was 2,718. Its county seat is Gove City, and its most populous city is Quinter.

History

Early history

Eighty million years ago, Gove County was part of an ancient inland sea known as the Western Interior Seaway. Many students still visit the Castle Rock Badlands today to explore fossils and find clues about the origins, and potentially future, of life on Earth.

For many millennia, the Great Plains of North America was inhabited by nomadic Native Americans.  From the 16th century to 18th century, the Kingdom of France claimed ownership of large parts of North America.  In 1762, after the French and Indian War, France secretly ceded New France to Spain, per the Treaty of Fontainebleau.

19th century
In 1802, Spain returned most of the land to France, but keeping title to about 7,500 square miles. In 1803, most of the land for modern day Kansas was acquired by the United States from France as part of the 828,000 square mile Louisiana Purchase for 2.83 cents per acre.

In 1854, the Kansas Territory was organized, then in 1861 Kansas became the 34th U.S. state.  In 1868, Gove County was established and named for Granville Llewellyn Gove, member of the 11th Regiment Kansas Volunteer Cavalry, and son of Moses Gove, a former mayor of Manhattan, Kansas.

21st century 

In 2020, USA Today profiled Gove County during the COVID-19 pandemic in the United States and called it the "deadliest place in America" due to it having the highest death rate from COVID-19 compared to any other county in the nation: 1 out of every 132 people. The first deaths were reported on October 7; as of November 2020, 20 residents died from the virus, and 314 other positive cases were reported. The article attributed the high death rate to predominant public opposition towards wearing face masks, doubts over the pandemic's severity, and the county's high median age, all of which left residents highly vulnerable.

Geography

Adjacent counties

 Sheridan County (north)
 Graham County (northeast)
 Trego County (east)
 Ness County (southeast)
 Lane County (south)
 Scott County (southwest)
 Logan County (west)
 Thomas County (northwest)

Demographics

As of the 2000 census, there were 3,068 people, 1,245 households, and 861 families residing in the county.  The population density was 3 people per square mile (1/km2).  There were 1,423 housing units at an average density of 1 per square mile (1/km2).  The racial makeup of the county was 97.95% White, 0.10% Black or African American, 0.16% Native American, 0.10% Asian, 0.72% from other races, and 0.98% from two or more races. Hispanic or Latino of any race were 1.24% of the population.

There were 1,245 households, out of which 28.40% had children under the age of 18 living with them, 63.50% were married couples living together, 3.50% had a female householder with no husband present, and 30.80% were non-families. 29.70% of all households were made up of individuals, and 17.50% had someone living alone who was 65 years of age or older.  The average household size was 2.42 and the average family size was 3.01.

In the county, the population was spread out, with 26.20% under the age of 18, 5.40% from 18 to 24, 22.10% from 25 to 44, 23.70% from 45 to 64, and 22.70% who were 65 years of age or older.  The median age was 43 years. For every 100 females there were 95.20 males.  For every 100 females age 18 and over, there were 92.30 males.

The median income for a household in the county was $33,510, and the median income for a family was $40,438. Males had a median income of $26,863 versus $21,357 for females. The per capita income for the county was $17,852.  About 8.00% of families and 10.30% of the population were below the poverty line, including 13.90% of those under age 18 and 6.90% of those age 65 or over.

In 2020, Gove County had 2,600 residents, and the median age was about 50, a decade older than the national average.

Government

Presidential elections

Laws
Although the Kansas Constitution was amended in 1986 to allow the sale of alcoholic liquor by the individual drink with the approval of voters, Gove County has remained a prohibition, or "dry", county.

Education

Unified school districts
 Grinnell USD 291
 Grainfield USD 292
 Quinter USD 293

Attractions
 Castle Rock
 Monument Rocks

Communities

Cities
 Gove City
 Grainfield
 Grinnell
 Oakley (part)
 Park
 Quinter

Unincorporated community
 Campus

Ghost towns
 Alanthus
 Jerome
 Orion

Townships
Gove County is divided into nine townships.  None of the cities within the county are considered governmentally independent, and all figures for the townships include those of the cities.  In the following table, the population center is the largest city (or cities) included in that township's population total, if it is of a significant size.

Gallery

See also
 Dry counties
 Iaceornis

References

Notes

Further reading

 Standard Atlas of Gove County, Kansas; Geo. A. Ogle & Co; 61 pages; 1907.

External links

County
 
 Gove County - Directory of Public Officials
Maps
 Gove County Maps: Current, Historic, KDOT
 Kansas Highway Maps: Current, Historic, KDOT
 Kansas Railroad Maps: Current, 1996, 1915, KDOT and Kansas Historical Society

 
Kansas counties
1868 establishments in Kansas
Populated places established in 1868